Martti Oiva Kalevi Ahtisaari (born 23 June 1937) is a Finnish politician, the tenth president of Finland (1994–2000), a Nobel Peace Prize laureate, and a United Nations diplomat and mediator noted for his international peace work.

Ahtisaari was a United Nations special envoy for Kosovo, charged with organizing the Kosovo status process negotiations, aimed at resolving a long-running dispute in Kosovo, which later declared its independence from Serbia in 2008. In October 2008, he was awarded the Nobel Peace Prize "for his important efforts, on several continents and over more than three decades, to resolve international conflicts". The Nobel statement said that Ahtisaari had played a prominent role in resolving serious and long-lasting conflicts, including ones in Namibia, Aceh (Indonesia), Kosovo and Serbia, and Iraq.

Since the death of Mauno Koivisto in May 2017, Martti Ahtisaari is currently the oldest living President of Finland.

Youth and early career 
Martti Ahtisaari was born in Viipuri, Finland (now Vyborg, Russia). His father, Oiva Ahtisaari (whose grandfather Julius Marenius Adolfsen had emigrated with his parents to Finland in 1872 from Tistedalen in Southern Norway) took Finnish citizenship in 1929 and Finnicized his surname from Adolfsen in 1936. The Continuation War (World War II) took Martti's father to the front as an NCO army mechanic, while his mother, Tyyne, moved to Kuopio with her son to escape immediate danger from the war. Kuopio was where Ahtisaari spent most of his childhood, eventually attending Kuopion Lyseo high school.

In 1952, Martti Ahtisaari moved to Oulu with his family to seek employment. There he continued his education in high school, graduating in 1956. He also joined the local YMCA. After completing his military service (Ahtisaari holds the rank of captain in the Finnish Army Reserve), he began to study through a distance-learning course at Oulu teachers' college. He was able to live at home while attending the two-year course which enabled him to qualify as a primary-school teacher in 1959. Besides his native language, Finnish, Ahtisaari speaks Swedish, French, English, and German.

In 1960, he moved to Karachi, Pakistan, to lead the Swedish Pakistani Institute's physical education training establishment, where he became accustomed to a more international environment. In addition to managing the students' home, Ahtisaari's job involved training teachers. He returned to Finland in 1963, and became active in non-governmental organizations responsible for aid to developing countries. He joined the international students' organisation AIESEC, where he discovered new passions about diversity and diplomacy. In 1965, he joined the Ministry for Foreign Affairs in its Bureau for International Development Aid, eventually becoming the assistant head of the department. In 1968, he married Eeva Irmeli Hyvärinen. The couple has one son, Marko Ahtisaari, a technology entrepreneur and musician.

Diplomatic career 
Ahtisaari spent several years as a diplomatic representative from Finland. He served as Finland's Ambassador to Tanzania from 1973 to 1977. As UN Deputy Secretary-General 1977–1981 and as United Nations Commissioner for Namibia from 1976 to 1981, working to secure the independence of Namibia from the Republic of South Africa.

Between 1987 and 1991 Ahtisaari was the Under-Secretary-General of the United Nations for administration and management.

Following the death of a later UN Commissioner for Namibia, Bernt Carlsson, on Pan Am Flight 103 on 21 December 1988 – on the eve of the signing of the Tripartite Accord at UN Headquarters – Ahtisaari was sent to Namibia in April 1989 as the UN Special Representative to head the United Nations Transition Assistance Group (UNTAG). Because of the illegal incursion of SWAPO troops from Angola, the South African appointed Administrator-General (AG), Louis Pienaar, sought Ahtisaari's agreement to the deployment of SADF troops to stabilize the situation. Ahtisaari took advice from British prime minister Margaret Thatcher, who was visiting the region at the time, and approved the SADF deployment. A period of intense fighting ensued when at least 375 SWAPO insurgents were killed. In July 1989, Glenys Kinnock and Tessa Blackstone of the British Council of Churches visited Namibia and reported: "There is a widespread feeling that too many concessions were made to South African personnel and preferences and that Martti Ahtisaari was not forceful enough in his dealings with the South Africans."

Perhaps because of his reluctance to authorise this SADF deployment, Ahtisaari was alleged to have been targeted by the South African Civil Cooperation Bureau (CCB). According to a hearing in September 2000 of the South African Truth and Reconciliation Commission, two CCB operatives (Kobus le Roux and Ferdinand Barnard) were tasked not to kill Ahtisaari, but to give him "a good hiding". To carry out the assault, Barnard had planned to use the grip handle of a metal saw as a knuckleduster. In the event, Ahtisaari did not attend the meeting at the Keetmanshoop Hotel, where Le Roux and Barnard lay in wait for him, and thus Ahtisaari escaped injury.

After the independence elections of 1989, Ahtisaari was appointed an honorary Namibian citizen. South Africa gave him the O R Tambo award for "his outstanding achievement as a diplomat and commitment to the cause of freedom in Africa and peace in the world".

Ahtisaari served as UN undersecretary general for administration and management from 1987 to 1991 causing mixed feelings inside the organisation during an internal investigation of massive fraud. When Ahtisaari revealed in 1990 that he had secretly lengthened the grace period allowing UN officials to return misappropriated taxpayer money from the original three months to three years, the investigators were furious. The 340 officials found guilty of fraud were able to return money even after their crime had been proven. The harshest punishment was the firing of twenty corrupt officials.

President of Finland 

Ahtisaari's presidential campaign in Finland began when he was still a member of the council dealing with Bosnia. Finland's ongoing recession caused established political figures to lose public support, and the presidential elections were now direct, instead of being conducted through an electoral college. In 1993, Ahtisaari accepted the candidacy of the Social Democratic Party. His politically untarnished image was a major factor in the election, as was his vision of Finland as an active participant in international affairs. Ahtisaari narrowly won over his second round opponent, Elisabeth Rehn of the Swedish People's Party.  During the campaign, there were rumours spread by some political opponents of Ahtisaari that he had a drinking problem or that he had knowingly accepted a double salary from the Finnish Foreign Ministry and from the United Nations while trying to negotiate an end to the Bosnian War. Ahtisaari denied both allegations and no firm proof of them has emerged.  During the three-week campaign between the two rounds of presidential elections, Ahtisaari was praised by his supporters for being more compassionate towards the many unemployed Finns than Rehn, who as Defence Minister had to officially support the Aho government's strict economic policies. A minor controversy arose during a town hall-style presidential debate in Lappeenranta, southeastern Finland, when an apparently born-again Christian woman in the audience asked Rehn what her relationship with Jesus was. Rehn replied that she had personally no proof that Jesus had been a historical person. Ahtisaari ducked a precise answer by stating that he trusted the Lutheran confession even on this issue.

His term as president began with a schism within the Centre Party government led by prime minister Esko Aho, who did not approve of Ahtisaari's being actively involved in foreign policy. There was also some controversy over Ahtisaari's speaking out on domestic issues such as unemployment. He travelled extensively in Finland and abroad, and was nicknamed "Matka-Mara" ("Travel-Mara", Mara being a common diminutive form of Martti). His monthly travels throughout the country and his meetings with ordinary citizens (the so-called maakuntamatkat or "provincial trips") nonetheless greatly enhanced his political popularity. Ahtisaari kept his campaign promise to visit one Finnish historical province every month during his presidency.  He also donated some thousands of Finnish marks per month to the unemployed people's organisations, and a few thousand Finnish marks to the Christian social organisation of the late lay preacher and social worker Veikko Hursti.

Ahtisaari favoured pluralism and religious tolerance publicly. Privately, he and his wife practise their Christian faith. Contrary to some of his predecessors and his successor as the Finnish President, Ahtisaari ended all of his New Year's speeches by wishing the Finnish people God's blessing.

In January 1998 Ahtisaari was criticized by some NGOs, politicians and notable cultural figures because he awarded Commander of the Order of the Lion of Finland to the Forest Minister of Indonesia and to the main owner of the Indonesian RGM Company, a parent company of the April Company. The April Company was criticized by non-governmental organisations for destroying rain forests, and Indonesia itself was criticized heavily for human right violations, especially in East Timor. Ahtisaari's party chairman Erkki Tuomioja said that giving medals was questionable since he feared the act may tarnish the public image of Finnish human rights policy. Students of the arts had demonstrations in Helsinki against the decision to give medals.

President Ahtisaari supported Finland's entry into the European Union, and in a 1994 referendum, 57 percent of Finnish voters were in favour of EU membership. He later stated that if Finland had not voted to join the EU he would have resigned. During Ahtisaari's term as president, Boris Yeltsin and Bill Clinton met in Helsinki. He also negotiated alongside Viktor Chernomyrdin with Slobodan Milošević to end the fighting in the Yugoslav province of Kosovo in 1999.

Often encountering resistance from the Finnish parliament, which preferred a more cautious foreign policy, as well as from within his own party, Ahtisaari did not seek re-election in 2000. He wanted the Social Democrats to re-nominate him for the presidency without opposition, but two opponents signed up for the party's presidential primary. Ahtisaari was the last "strong president", before the 2000 constitution reduced the president's powers. He was succeeded by the foreign minister Tarja Halonen.

Post-presidential career 

In Finnish politics, Ahtisaari has stressed how important it is for Finland to join NATO. Ahtisaari has argued that Finland should be a full member of NATO and the EU in order "to shrug off once and for all the burden of Finlandization". He believes politicians should file application and make Finland a member. He says that the way Finnish politicians avoid expressing their opinion is disturbing. He has noted that the so-called "NATO option" (acquiring membership when Finland is threatened) is an illusion, making an analogy to trying to obtain fire insurance when the fire has already started.

Since leaving office, Ahtisaari has held positions in various international organisations. In 2000, he became Chairman of the Brussels-based International Crisis Group, an NGO to which he committed $100,000 in government funding in 1994 one month after becoming elected President of Finland. He remains Chairman Emeritus.

Ahtisaari also founded the independent Crisis Management Initiative (CMI) with the goal of developing and sustaining peace in troubled areas. On 1 December 2000, Ahtisaari was awarded the J. William Fulbright Prize for International Understanding by the Fulbright Association in recognition of his work as peacemaker in some of the world's most troubled areas. In May 2017 Ahtisaari suggested as new CMI leader Alexander Stubb a Finnish politician representing Finnish conservatives i.e. the National Coalition Party.

In 2000–01, Ahtisaari and Cyril Ramaphosa inspected IRA weapons dumps for the Independent International Commission on Decommissioning, as part of the Northern Ireland peace process.

In 2005, Ahtisaari successfully led peace negotiations between the Free Aceh Movement (GAM) and the Indonesian government through his non-governmental organization CMI. The negotiations ended on 15 August 2005 with the signing of the Helsinki MOU on disarmament of GAM rebels, the dropping of GAM demands for an independent Aceh, and a withdrawal of Indonesian forces.

In November 2005, UN Secretary-General Kofi Annan appointed Ahtisaari as Special Envoy for the Kosovo status process which was to determine whether Kosovo, having been administered by the United Nations since 1999, should become independent or remain a province of Serbia. In early 2006, Ahtisaari opened the UN Office of the Special Envoy for Kosovo (UNOSEK) in Vienna, Austria, from where he conducted the Kosovo status negotiations. Those opposed to Ahtisaari's settlement proposal, which involved an internationally monitored independence for Kosovo, sought to discredit him. Allegations made by Balkan media sources of corruption and improper conduct by Ahtisaari were described by US State Department spokesman Tom Casey as "spurious", adding that Ahtisaari's plan is the "best solution possible" and has the "full endorsement of the United States". The New York Times suggested that this criticism of Ahtisaari on the part of the Serbs had led to the "bogging down" of the Kosovo status talks. In November 2008, Serbian media reported Pierre Mirel, director of the EU enlargement commission's western Balkans division as saying: "The EU has accepted that the deployment of EULEX has to be approved by the United Nations Security Council, and that the mission has to be neutral and will not be related to the Ahtisaari plan," Mirel said, following his meeting with Serbia's vice-president Bozidar Djelic.

In July 2007, however, when the EU, Russia and the United States agreed to find a new format for the talks, Ahtisaari announced that he regarded his mission as over. Since neither the UN nor the troika had asked him to continue mediations in the face of Russia's persistent refusal to support independence for Kosovo, he said he would nonetheless be willing to take on "a role as consultant", if requested. After a period of uncertainty and mounting tension, Kosovo unilaterally declared its independence from Serbia in February 2008.

In his work, he has emphasised the importance of the United States in the peace process, stating that "There can be no peace without America."

Ahtisaari was chairman of the Interpeace Governing Council from 2000 to 2009. 
Since 2009, Ahtisaari has been Chairman Emeritus and a Special Advisor.

Ahtisaari is board director of the ImagineNations Group.

In 2008 Ahtisaari was awarded an honorary degree by University College, London. That same year he received the 2007 UNESCO Félix Houphouët-Boigny Peace Prize, for "his lifetime contribution to world peace".

In September 2009 Ahtisaari joined The Elders, a group of independent global leaders who work together on peace and human rights issues. He travelled to the Korean Peninsula with fellow Elders Gro Harlem Brundtland, Jimmy Carter and Mary Robinson in April 2011, and to South Sudan with Robinson and Archbishop Desmond Tutu in July 2012.

Ahtisaari is a member of the Mo Ibrahim Foundation's Ibrahim Prize Committee. He is also a member of the board of the European Council on Foreign Relations.

Syria conflict 

In August 2012, Ahtisaari opined on the sectarian violence in Syria and was mentioned as a possible replacement as Joint Envoy there to succeed former Secretary-General Kofi Annan. However, Ahtisaari then told the Finnish state broadcaster YLE that "he wished the mission would fall on someone else" which it ultimately did in the person of Lakhdar Brahimi, a former Algerian foreign minister and longtime U.N. diplomat.

In late 2015, Martti Ahtisaari reiterated charges he already had made in an interview with German broadcaster Deutsche Welle in early 2013 against members of the UN security council on the obstruction of a political solution to the escalating conflict in Syria. Ahtisaari said in an interview in September 2015 that he held talks about Syria with envoys from the five permanent members of the UN security council in February 2012. According to Ahtisaari, Vitaly Churkin, Russian ambassador to the United Nations, laid out three points during a meeting with him, which included not arming the Syrian opposition, commencing talks between Syrian president Assad and the opposition and finding "an elegant way for Assad to step aside". But the US, Britain and France subsequently ignored the proposal. Ahtisaari said in the interview: "Nothing happened because I think all these, and many others, were convinced that Assad would be thrown out of office in a few weeks so there was no need to do anything."

Health
On 24 March 2020, amid the large-scale outbreak of COVID-19, it was announced that Ahtisaari had tested positive for the disease. His spouse, Eeva Ahtisaari, was diagnosed with the same virus on 21 March. Eeva Ahtisaari attended the International Women's Day concert on 8 March at the Helsinki Music Centre while infected.

On 14 April 2020 it was announced that Martti and Eeva Ahtisaari are recovering from the coronavirus infection.

On 2 September 2021 it was announced that Ahtisaari is suffering from Alzheimer's disease and has retired from public life.

Honours

Nobel Peace Prize 

On 10 October 2008 Ahtisaari was announced as that year's recipient of the Nobel Peace Prize. Ahtisaari received the prize on 10 December 2008 at Oslo City Hall in Norway. Ahtisaari twice worked to find a solution in Kosovo – first in 1999 and again between 2005 and 2007. He also worked with others this year to find a peaceful solution to the problems in Iraq, the committee said. According to the committee, Ahtisaari and his group, Crisis Management Initiative (CMI), also contributed to resolving other conflicts in Northern Ireland, Central Asia, and the Horn of Africa. Ahtisaari invited Prime Minister Matti Vanhanen, Foreign Affairs Minister Alexander Stubb and others to his Nobel event, but not President Halonen.

According to the memoir of the former secretary of the Norwegian Nobel Committee, Geir Lundestad, former Foreign Minister and UN ambassador Keijo Korhonen, who was strongly against awarding the 2008 Nobel Peace Prize to Ahtisaari, wrote a letter to the committee which negatively portrayed Ahtisaari as a person and his merits in international conflict zones.

National honours
 :
 Grand Cross of the Order of the Cross of Liberty
 Grand Cross with Collar of the Order of the White Rose of Finland
 Commander Grand Cross of the Order of the Lion of Finland
 Order of Holy Lamb
Recipient of the Medal of St.Henrik

Foreign honours
:
 National Flag Decoration (12 September 2016)
:
 Honorary Officer of the Order of Australia (2002)
:
 Grand Cross with Collar of the Order of the Liberator General San Martín (3 March 1997)
 :
 Grand Cordon of the Order of Leopold
 :
 Grand Cross of the Order of the Southern Cross
:
 Collar of the Order of Merit
 :
 Knight of the Order of the Elephant (1994)
 Knight of the Order of the Dannebrog
:
 Collar of the Order of the Cross of Terra Mariana
:
 Grand Cross of the Order of Legion of Honour
:
 Grand Cross Special Class of the Order of Merit of the Federal Republic of Germany
 :
 Grand Cross of the Order of the Redeemer
:
 Grand Cross of the Order of Merit of the Republic of Hungary
 :
 Collar with Grand Cross of the Order of the Falcon (26 September 1995) 
 :
 Third Class of the Star of the Republic of Indonesia
 :
 Knight Grand Cross with Collar of the Order of Merit of the Italian Republic (1997)
:
 Grand Cordon of the Order of Mubarak the Great
:
 Commander Grand Cross of the Order of the Three Stars
:
 Grand Cross of the Order of Vytautas the Great (1996)
:
 Honorary Recipient of the Most Exalted Order of the Crown of the Realm (1995)
:
 Collar of the Order of the Aztec Eagle
:
 Knight Grand Cross of the Order of the Netherlands Lion
 :
 Grand Cross with Collar of the Order of St. Olav (1994)
 :
 Knight of the Order of the White Eagle (1997)
 :
 Grand Cross of the Order of the Star of Romania
 :
 Supreme Companion of the Order of the Companions of O. R. Tambo (16 June 2004)
 Grand Cross of the Order of Good Hope (1997)
:
 Knight of the Collar of the Order of Isabella the Catholic
 :
 Knight with Collar (1996) of the Royal Order of the Seraphim (1994)
:
 First Class of the Order of State of Republic of Turkey (1999)
:
 First Class of the Order of Yaroslav the Wise
 :
 First Class of the Order of Federation
:
 Honorary Knight Grand Cross of the Order of the Bath (1995)

Awards 
1995: Zamenhof Prize for International Understanding, of the World Esperanto Association
1998: Honorary doctorate from Helsinki University of Technology, and from National University of Kyiv-Mohyla Academy 
2000: J. William Fulbright Prize for International Understanding
2000: Freedom medal
2000: : Hessian Peace Prize
2004: OR Tambo Award
2006: Gold Medal of The American-Scandinavian Foundation 
2007: : Manfred Wörner Medal of the German Ministry of Defense 
2007: Honorary degree, University of St. Gallen, Switzerland
2008: Delta Prize for Global Understanding
2008: Félix Houphouët-Boigny Peace Prize
2008: Nobel Peace Prize
2008: : Geuzenpenning
2011: Honorary degree, University of Calgary, Canada

See also
 List of peace activists

References

External links 

Martti Ahtisaari's homepage
Martti Ahtisaari's Project Syndicate op/eds

Ahtisaari Nobel Prize lecture
ThisisFINLAND -Nobel recognition rewards peaceful resolutions
 
 Martti Ahtisaari in The Presidents of Finland

 
Living people
1937 births
Presidents of Finland
Nobel Peace Prize laureates
Finnish Nobel laureates
Finnish officials of the United Nations
Social Democratic Party of Finland politicians
University of Oulu alumni
Finnish schoolteachers
YMCA leaders
Finnish people of Norwegian descent
Finnish Lutherans
Politicians from Vyborg
People with Alzheimer's disease

Knights Grand Cross of the Order of the Falcon
Knights of the Order of the Dannebrog
Recipients of the Collar of the Order of the Cross of Terra Mariana
Grand Crosses of the Order of Vytautas the Great
Knights Grand Cross of the Order of Merit of the Italian Republic
Honorary Knights Grand Cross of the Order of the Bath
Collars of the Order of Isabella the Catholic
Recipients of the Order of Prince Yaroslav the Wise, 1st class
Under-Secretaries-General of the United Nations
Ambassadors of Finland to Somalia
Ambassadors of Finland to Zambia
Ambassadors of Finland to Mozambique
Ambassadors of Finland to Ethiopia
Ambassadors of Finland to Tanzania
Recipients of the Four Freedoms Award
Candidates for President of Finland
Finnish expatriates in Pakistan
Finnish expatriates in Namibia
Grand Crosses of the Order of the Star of Romania
Special Representatives of the Secretary-General of the United Nations
Special Envoys of the Secretary-General of the United Nations
Diplomats from Vyborg